Kodala is a town and a Notified Area Council in Ganjam District in the Indian State of Odisha.

Geography
It has an average elevation of 16 metres (52 feet).

Demographics
 India census, Kodala had a population of 12,341. Males constitute 50% of the population and females 50%. Kodala has an average literacy rate of 54%, lower than the national average of 59.5%: male literacy is 66%, and female literacy is 42%. In Kodala, 15% of the population is under 6 years of age.

Politics
Current MLA V Sugyanikumar Deo 2014-2019 MLA from Kabisuryanagar Assembly constituency is Niranjan Pradhan of BJD, who won the seat in State elections in 2004. Rama Krushna Pattanaik won this seat as BJD candidate in 2000, as JD in 1995 and 1990, and as JND candidate in 1985 and 1977. Kanhu Charan Naik of INC(I) had won this seat in 1980.

Kodala is part of Aska (Lok Sabha constituency).

Climate and regional setting
Maximum summer temperature is 37 °C; minimum winter temperature is 17 °C. The mean daily temperature varies from 33 °C to 38 °C. May is the hottest month; December is the coldest. The average annual rainfall is 1250 mm and the region receives monsoon and torrential rainfall from July to October.

References

Cities and towns in Ganjam district